Petr Kment (20 August 1942 − 22 August 2013) was a wrestler who competed for Czechoslovakia. He was born in Prague. He won an Olympic bronze medal in Greco-Roman wrestling in 1968. He also competed at the 1964 Olympics, where he placed fourth.

References

1942 births
2013 deaths
Sportspeople from Prague
Czechoslovak male sport wrestlers
Olympic wrestlers of Czechoslovakia
Wrestlers at the 1968 Summer Olympics
Wrestlers at the 1964 Summer Olympics
Wrestlers at the 1972 Summer Olympics
Czech male sport wrestlers
Olympic bronze medalists for Czechoslovakia
Olympic medalists in wrestling
Medalists at the 1968 Summer Olympics